The Eastern Macedonia Army Section (Tmima Stratias Anatolikis Makedonias, TSAM) was a field army of the Hellenic Army in World War II. It faced the initial German attack on Greece during the Battle of the Metaxas Line, and was forced to capitulate after four days of fighting on 9 April 1941.

History
Pre-war Greek planning focused on a possible conflict with Bulgaria in Macedonia and Western Thrace. For the defence of eastern Macedonia, the plans foresaw the creation of a Kavala Army Section (Τμήμα Στρατιάς Καβάλας), headquartered at Kavala and composed of a Group of Divisions (Ομάς Μεραρχιών) in the Axios River area, comprising 6th and 17th Infantry Divisions and the Hellenic Army's sole Cavalry Division, as well as of the IV Army Corps (7th and 14th Divisions, 7th and 14th Brigades) in the area of Kavala.

Following the Italian attack on Greece on 28 October 1940, Kavala Army Section was mobilized, under the command of Lt. General Markos Drakos, but was renamed as the Eastern Macedonia Army Section in early November.

Leadership

Commanders
 Lt. General Markos Drakos (28 October 1940 – 7 February 1941)
 Lt. General Konstantinos Bakopoulos (7 February – 9 April 1941)

Chiefs of staff
 Col. Kleanthis Boulalas (28 October – 19 December 1940)
 Col. Theodoros Grigoropoulos (19 December 1940 – 7 February 1941)
 Col. Panagiotis Kalogeropoulos (7 February – 9 April 1941)

Headquarters
 Serres (28 October 1940)
 Thessaloniki (8 February 1941)

References

Sources 
 

Field armies of Greece
Battle of Greece
Military units and formations established in 1940
Military units and formations disestablished in 1941
Military units and formations of Greece in World War II
Greek Macedonia in World War II